Michèle Hovey Raymond (born 1958) is a Canadian politician and author. She formerly served as Halifax Atlantic's NDP MLA.

Early life and education
A Halifax-area resident since 1963, she received degrees from Yale 1978 and Dalhousie in Linguistics and Law, respectively.

Before politics
Prior to becoming a politician, Raymond co-founded the Urban Farm Museum Society of Spryfield and has been part of a campaign to reactivate the Northwest Arm Ferry. She has volunteered with the Nova Scotia Museum and is the vice-president of the Heritage Trust of Nova Scotia and other heritage societies around Nova Scotia for which she was awarded the Queen's Jubilee Medal. She is also the co-author with historian Heather Watts of Halifax's Northwest Arm: An Illustrated History published by Formac Publishing in 2003.

Political career
In her first attempt at political office, Raymond was elected MLA in 2003, replacing Robert Chisholm, who retired.

On November 23, 2012, Raymond announced that she would not be reoffering in the next election.

Personal life
She is married to former Liberal MLA Russell MacKinnon.

References

Yale University alumni
Schulich School of Law alumni
Nova Scotia New Democratic Party MLAs
Women MLAs in Nova Scotia
Living people
21st-century Canadian politicians
21st-century Canadian women politicians
1958 births